The papal conclave held from 31 July to 4 August 1903 saw the election of Cardinal Giuseppe Melchiorre Sarto to become pope in succession to Leo XIII, who had died on 20 July after a 25-year-long pontificate. Some 62 cardinals participated in the balloting. Emperor Franz Joseph of Austria asserted the right claimed by certain Catholic rulers to veto a candidate for the papacy, blocking the election of the leading candidate, Cardinal Secretary of State Mariano Rampolla. Sarto was elected on the seventh ballot and took the name Pius X.

Background
The pontificate of Leo XIII came to an end on 20 July 1903 after 25 years, longer than any previous elected pope, except his predecessor Pius IX; together, they had reigned 57 years. While Pius had been a conservative reactionary, Leo had been seen as a liberal, certainly in comparison with his predecessor. As cardinals gathered, the key question was whether a pope would be chosen who would continue Leo's policies or return to the style of papacy of Pius IX.

Of the 64 cardinals, 62 participated, the largest number to enter a conclave up until that time. Luigi Oreglia di Santo Stefano was the only elector with previous experience of electing a pope. Health prevented Michelangelo Celesia of Palermo from traveling and Patrick Francis Moran of Sydney was not expected before August 20. The conclave included James Cardinal Gibbons of Baltimore, who was the first American cardinal to participate in a papal conclave.

Balloting
When the cardinals assembled in the Sistine Chapel, attention focused on Cardinal Secretary of State Mariano Rampolla, though cardinals from the German and Austro-Hungarian Empires preferred a candidate more closely aligned with their interests, which meant relatively hostile to France and republicanism and less supportive of the social justice advocacy of Leo XIII. They were persuaded that their first choice, Serafino Vannutelli, who had been a Vatican diplomat in Vienna, was not electable and settled on Girolamo Maria Gotti instead.

After a first day without balloting, the cardinals voted once each morning and once each afternoon. The first ballots were taken on the second day of the conclave, and that afternoon's ballot had 29 votes for Rampolla, 16 for Gotti, and 10 for Giuseppe Melchiorre Sarto, and others scattered. Some of the Germans thought that Gotti's appeal was limited and decided to support Sarto as their best alternative to Rampolla, who otherwise appeared likely to win the two-thirds vote required, which was 42. As the cardinals were completing their third set of ballots on the morning of 2 August, Cardinal Jan Puzyna de Kosielsko, the Prince-Bishop of Kraków and a subject of Austria-Hungary, acting on instructions from Franz Joseph, Emperor of Austria, exercised the Emperor's right of jus exclusivae, that is, to veto one candidate. At first there were objections and some cardinals wanted to ignore the Emperor's communication. Then Rampolla called it "an affront to the dignity of the Sacred College" but withdrew himself from consideration saying that "with regard to my humble person, I declare that nothing could be more honorable, nothing more agreeable could have happened." Nevertheless the third ballot showed no change in support for Rampolla, still with 29 votes, while the next two candidates had switched positions, with 21 for Sarto and 9 for Gotti. Several cardinals later wrote of their disgust at the Emperor's intervention, one writing that it left a "great, painful impression on all". 

The afternoon tested the remaining sympathy for Rampolla, who gained a single vote, while Sarto had 24 and Gotti fell to 3. The precise impact of the Emperor's intervention is difficult to assess, since Rampolla continued to have strong support for several ballots. Yet one contemporaneous assessment held that "After calm reflection, those who had voted for Rampolla up to this time had to consider that an election against the expressed wish of the Emperor of Austria would at once place the new Pope in a most unpleasant position." The fifth ballot on the morning on the fourth day (3 August) showed Sarto leading with 27, Rampolla down to 24, and Gotti at 6, with a few still scattered. Sarto then announced that the cardinals should vote for someone else, that he did not have what was required of a pope. The movement toward Sarto continued in the afternoon: Sarto 35, Rampolla 16, Gotti 7. On the morning of 4 August, on the seventh ballot, the conclave elected Sarto with 50 votes, leaving 10 for Rampolla and 2 for Gotti.

Sarto took the name Pius X. Following the practice of his two immediate predecessors since the 1870 invasion of Rome, Pius X gave his first Urbi et Orbi blessing on a balcony facing into St. Peter's Basilica rather than facing the crowds outside, a symbolic representation of his opposition to Italian rule of Rome and his demand for a return of the Papal States to his authority.

End of the veto

On 20 January 1904, less than six months after his election, Pius X issued the apostolic constitution Commissum Nobis which prohibited the exercise of the jus exclusivae. Where previous popes had issued rules restricting outside influence on the cardinal electors, Pius used more thorough and detailed language, prohibiting not only the assertion of the right to veto but even the expression of "a simple desire" to that effect. He set automatic excommunication as the penalty for violating his strictures. He also required conclave participants to swear an oath to abide by these rules and not allow any influence by "lay powers of any grade or order".

Data
 Dates of conclave: July 31 - August 4, 1903
 Location: Sistine Chapel in the Vatican Palace
 Absent:
Michelangelo Celesia, O.S.B., Archbishop of Palermo (Italy) was too ill to travel
 Patrick Francis Moran, Archbishop of Sydney in Australia was unable to reach Rome in time to participate 

 Present:
Antonio Agliardi, Cardinal-Bishop of Albano (Italy)
Andrea Aiuti, Apostolic Nuncio emeritus to Portugal (Italy)
Bartolomeo Bacilieri, Bishop of Verona (Italy)
Giulio Boschi, Archbishop of Ferrara (Italy)
Alfonso Capecelatro di Castelpagano, C.O., Archbishop of Capua (Italy)
Giovanni Battista Casali del Drago (Italy)
Salvador Casañas y Pagés, Bishop of Barcelona (Spain)
Francesco di Paola Cassetta, titular Patriarch of Nicomedia (Italy)
Felice Cavagnis, Pro-Secretary of the Roman Curia (Italy)
Beniamino Cavicchioni, Secretary of the Congregation of the Council (Italy)
Pierre-Hector Coullié, Archbishop of Lyon (France)
Serafino Cretoni, Prefect of the Congregation of Rites (Italy)
Francesco Salesio Della Volpe, Prefect of the Apostolic Chamber (Italy)
Angelo Di Pietro, titular Archbishop of Nazianzus (Italy)
Andrea Carlo Ferrari, Archbishop of Milan (Italy)
Domenico Ferrata, titular Archbishop of Thessalonica (Italy)
Anton Hubert Fischer, Archbishop of Cologne (Germany)
Giuseppe Francica-Nava di Bontifé, Archbishop of Catania (Italy)
Casimiro Gennari, titular Archbishop of Naupactus (Italy)
James Gibbons, Archbishop of Baltimore (United States of America)
Pierre-Lambert Goossens, Archbishop of Mechelen (Belgium)
Girolamo Maria Gotti, O.C.D., Prefect of the Congregation for the Propagation of the Faith (Italy)
Anton Joseph Gruscha, Archbishop of Vienna (Austria-Hungary)
Sebastián Herrero y Espinosa de los Monteros, Valencia (Spain)
Johannes Katschthaler, Archbishop of Salzburg (Austria-Hungary)
Georg von Kopp, Archbishop of Breslau (Germany)
Guillaume-Marie-Joseph Labouré, Archbishop of Rennes (France)
Benoit-Marie Langénieux, Archbishop of Reims (France)
Victor-Lucien-Sulpice Lécot, Archbishop of Bordeaux (France)
Michael Logue, Archbishop of Armagh (United Kingdom of Great Britain & Ireland)
Luigi Macchi (Italy)
Achille Manara, Bishop of Ancona and Numana (Italy)
José María Martín de Herrera y de la Iglesia, Archbishop of Santiago de Compostela (Spain)
Sebastiano Martinelli, O.S.A., titular Archbishop of Ephesus, curial official (Italy)
François-Désiré Mathieu, Archbishop Emeritus of Toulouse (France)
Mario Mocenni, Cardinal-Bishop of Sabina (Italy)
José Sebastião de Almeida Neto, O.F.M., Patriarch of Lisbon (Portugal)
Carlo Nocella, titular Latin Patriarch of Constantinople (Italy)
Adolphe Perraud, Bishop of Autun (France)
Raffaele Pierotti, O.P., Theologian of the Pontifical Household (Italy)
Gennaro Portanova, Archbishop of Reggio Calabria (Italy)
Giuseppe Antonio Ermenegildo Prisco, Archbishop of Naples (Italy)
Jan Maurycy Pawel Puzyna de Kosielsko, Prince-Bishop of Kraków (Austria-Hungary)
Mariano Rampolla, Cardinal Secretary of State (Italy)
Pietro Respighi, Archbishop Emeritus of Ferrara (Italy)
Agostino Gaetano Riboldi, Archbishop of Ravenna (Italy)
François-Marie-Benjamin Richard de la Vergne, Archbishop of Paris (France)
Agostino Richelmy, Archbishop of Turin (Italy)
Ciriaco María Sancha y Hervás, Archbishop of Toledo (Spain)
Alessandro Sanminiatelli Zabarella, titular Patriarch of Tyana (Italy)
Giuseppe Melchiorre Sarto, Patriarch of Venice (Italy)
Francesco Satolli, Cardinal-Bishop of Frascati, Prefect of the Congregation of Studies (Italy)
Francesco Segna, Archivist of the Holy Roman Church (Italy)
Lev Skrbenský z Hříště, Archbishop of Prague (Austria-Hungary)
Luigi Oreglia di Santo Stefano. Dean of the Sacred College of Cardinals (Italy)
Andreas Steinhuber, S.J., Prefect of the Congregation of the Index (Germany)
Domenico Svampa, Archbishop of Bologna (Italy)
Emidio Taliani, titular Archbishop of Sebastea, Apostolic Nuncio to Austria-Hungary (Italy)
Luigi Tripepi, Prefect of the Congregation of Rites (Italy)
Serafino Vannutelli, Cardinal-Bishop of Porto-Santa Rufina, Prefect of the Congregation of Ceremonies (Italy)
Vincenzo Vannutelli, Cardinal-Bishop of Palestrina (Italy)
Kolos Ferenc Vaszary, Archbishop of Esztergom (Austria-Hungary)
José Calassanç Vives y Tuto, O.F.M. Cap. (Spain)
 Cardinals by country (participating)'':
Unified Kingdom of Italy - 38
French Republic - 7
Austro-Hungarian Empire - 5
Kingdom of Spain - 5
German Empire - 3
Kingdom of Belgium - 1
United Kingdom of Great Britain & Ireland - 1
Kingdom of Portugal - 1
United States of America - 1
Total - 62

Notes

References 

Additional sources

1903 elections in Europe
1903
20th-century Catholicism
1903 in Christianity
1903 in Italy
1900s in Rome
July 1903 events
August 1903 events